Bjørn Eidsvåg (born 17 March 1954) is a Norwegian pop singer, songwriter, and ordained Lutheran minister. He was born in Sauda, and is a graduate of the MF Norwegian School of Theology. He has released more than 25 albums since his 1976 debut and received the Norwegian music award the Spellemannsprisen at least three times.

Discography

Albums

Albums (Denmark)

Singles
(Selective. Charting in VG-lista Norwegian Singles Chart)

References

1954 births
Living people
Melodi Grand Prix contestants
Spellemannprisen winners
Norwegian songwriters
Norwegian male singers
Norwegian-language singers
Norwegian Christians
People from Sauda